Algeria participated in the 2010 Summer Youth Olympics in Singapore.

The Algerian team consisted of 21 athletes competing in 10 sports: Athletics, Badminton, Equestrian, Gymnastics, Judo, Sailing, Swimming, Table Tennis, Weightlifting and Wrestling.

Medalists

Athletics

Boys
Track and Road Events

Girls
Track and Road Events

Badminton

Boys

Equestrian

Gymnastics

Artistic Gymnastics

Boys

Girls

Judo

Individual

Team

Sailing

One Person Dinghy

Windsurfing

Swimming

Table Tennis

Individual

Team

Weightlifting

Wrestling

Freestyle

Greco-Roman

References

External links 
Competitors List: Algeria

2010 in Algerian sport
Nations at the 2010 Summer Youth Olympics
Algeria at the Youth Olympics